is a Japanese musician, singer, and composer from Gifu Prefecture who is affiliated with Ignite Management and Sony Music Associated Records. He began his career in 2014 when he started uploading songs created using Vocaloid software on the Japanese video-sharing website Niconico under the name . In 2017, he started making songs using his own voice. He gained popularity in 2018 with his song "Yellow", which became popular on YouTube and TikTok. He made his major debut under Sony in 2020; his music has been featured in anime series such as Drifting Dragons and Horimiya.

Career
Kamiyama's music career began in November 2014 when, under the name , he uploaded a Vocaloid song titled  on the Japanese video sharing website Nicovideo; the song's video has over 500,000 views as of November 2021. In 2017, he released the song "Quiet Room", which was his first song to feature his own voice; the song has over 12 million views on YouTube as of November 2021. In 2018, he began using the stage name Yoh Kamiyama and released the song "Yellow"; the song has been viewed on YouTube over 125 million times as of February 2023.

In 2020, Kamiyama made his major debut under Sony Music Associated Records. His first major single, was released on March 4, 2020; the title song was used as the opening theme to the anime television series Drifting Dragons. His second major single  was released on March 10, 2021; the title song was used as the opening theme to the anime television series Horimiya. The single also served as the first release of Studio Nui, a new subsidiary label under Sony Music Associated Records.

Discography

As  (uki3/ewe) 

 error (2016)
 facsimile (2017). Along with balloon.
 troy (2017)

As Yoh Kamiyama 

  (e.w.e., 2019).
  (e.w.e., 2019).
  (Sony Music Entertainment Japan, 2020).
  (Sony Music Entertainment Japan, 2021).
 CLOSET. (Sony Music Entertainment Japan, 2022)

References

External links
 
 神山羊 on Sony Music
 
 
 
有機酸 on NicoVideo
有機酸 on Piapro
 

Anime musicians
Japanese male musicians
Living people
Musicians from Gifu Prefecture
Utaite
Year of birth missing (living people)